Vann R. Newkirk II (born December 27, 1988) is an American journalist and staff writer for The Atlantic who writes on politics, the environment, race, and healthcare policy.

Early life
Vann Newkirk grew up in Rocky Mount, North Carolina, the son of Dr. Vann Newkirk and Marylin Newkirk. He graduated from Morehouse College in 2010 and UNC-Chapel Hill with a Masters of Science in Public Health in Health Policy in 2012.

Career
Newkirk began his career as a policy analyst for the Kaiser Family Foundation, specializing in health policy issues.

Newkirk was inspired to begin freelancing after the shooting of Michael Brown and subsequent unrest in Ferguson, Missouri in 2014, and has been a staff writer for The Atlantic magazine since 2016. In 2018, Newkirk helped produce a special commemorative issue of the magazine on Martin Luther King Jr.'s legacy over the 50 years since King's assassination in 1968. , Newkirk was working on a longform podcast, exploring the aftermath of Hurricane Katrina.

Newkirk has appeared as a guest on various media outlets, including The Daily Show and shows on NPR, and has been a host or keynote speaker at a number of conferences on race and identity at universities throughout the United States.

Newkirk also founded and is a contributing editor to Seven Scribes, a website dedicated to promoting writers and artists of color.

Personal life
Newkirk lives in Hyattsville, Maryland with his wife and family. He is an aspiring science fiction writer.

References

American male essayists
American male journalists
Living people
Morehouse College alumni
UNC Gillings School of Global Public Health alumni
People from Rocky Mount, North Carolina
The Atlantic (magazine) people
Writers from North Carolina
21st-century American male writers
1988 births